George Henry Fritts Jr. (December 30, 1919 – February 7, 1987) was an American football player and coach.  A native of Lenoir City, Tennessee, Fritts attended Lenoir City High School before accepting a full scholarship to Clemson University.  He played guard for the Clemson team from 1939 to 1942.

Fritts played in Clemson, first bowl game, the 1940 Cotton Bowl Classic.  After serving in World War II, he was hired to coach the Columbus, Georgia, football team but a manager in the front office of the Philadelphia Eagles  contacted him for completing his requirements for professional football.   An earlier exposure to high levels of radiation during World War II left him with a disability which resulted in his loss of eyesight after three years of playing for Philadelphia.

Frank Howard hired him to be an assistant coach at Clemson and after a few years there he left to coach at Gaffney High School and Boiling Springs High School in South Carolina and Appling County High School and Groves High School in Georgia, later becoming a high school principal.
In 1977, he was inducted in the Clemson University Hall of Fame. and was recognized as a first-team all-century team at Clemson in 1998.

He died on February 7, 1987, after a long illness.

References

External links
 
 

1919 births
1987 deaths
American football guards
American football tackles
Clemson Tigers football coaches
Clemson Tigers football players
Newberry Wolves football coaches
Philadelphia Eagles players
High school football coaches in South Carolina
American military personnel of World War II
People from Lenoir City, Tennessee
Players of American football from Tennessee
American blind people